The 2012–13 Mid-American Conference women's basketball season began with practices in October 2012, followed by the start of the 2012–13 NCAA Division I women's basketball season in November. Conference play began in January 2013 and concluded in March 2013. Toledo won the regular season title with a record of 15–1 by three games over Ball State, Akron, and Central Michigan. Rachel Tecca of Akron was named MAC player of the year.

Fourth seeded Central Michigan won the MAC tournament over third seeded Akron. Crystal Bradford of Central Michigan was the tournament MVP. Central Michiagn lost to Oklahoma in the first round of the NCAA tournament. Toledo, Akron, Bowling Green, Miami and Ball State played in the WNIT.

Preseason awards
The preseason poll and league awards were announced by the league office on October 30, 2012.

Preseason women's basketball poll
(First place votes in parenthesis)

East Division
  (16)
  (13)
  (1)
 Ohio

West Division
  (24)
  (6)

Tournament champs
Toledo (16), Central Michigan (12), Bowling Green (2)

Honors

Postseason

Mid–American tournament

NCAA tournament

Women's National Invitational Tournament

Postseason awards

Coach of the Year: Tricia Cullop, Toledo
Player of the Year: Rachel Tecca, Akron
Freshman of the Year: Nathalie Fontaine, Ball State
Defensive Player of the Year: Andola Dortch, Toledo
Sixth Man of the Year: Shanee' Jackson, Ball State

Honors

See also
2012–13 Mid-American Conference men's basketball season

References